The women's competition in the middleweight (– 63 kg) division was held on 7–8 November 2011.

Schedule

Medalists

Records

Results

New records

References

(Pages 36, 38 & 40) Start List 
2011 IWF World Championships Results Book Pages 17–19 
Results

2011 World Weightlifting Championships
World